Cellach mac Segdai, 20th Abbot of Clonmacnoise, died 740.

The Annals of Tigernach state that he came from Buidemnach; the Annals of the Four Masters state that he was of the Conmaicne, specifically the Conmaicne Cenoil Dubain or Conmaicne Dun Mor. This area is now centred on Dunmore, County Galway.

Cellach succeeded Conmael ua Loichene in 737. His own successor was Comman.

References

 The Abbatial Succession at Clonmacnois, p. 500, John Ryan in Feil-Sgribhinn Eoin Mhic Neill, Dublin, 1938.

8th-century Irish abbots
People from County Galway
People of Conmaicne Dúna Móir